Paul B. Eastwood (born 3 December 1965) is a former Rugby League International goal kicking winger who played for Hull FC and Hull Kingston Rovers between 1984 and 1996. He also made 18 test appearances for the Great Britain between 1990 and 1992.

Background
Eastwood was born in Kingston upon Hull, East Riding of Yorkshire, England

Career
Paul Eastwood was signed by Hull F.C. as a teenager and made his first appearance for them in 1984.

Eastwood played , i.e. number 5, in Hull FC's 24-31 defeat by Castleford in the 1986 Yorkshire County Cup Final during the 1986–87 season at Headingley, Leeds on Saturday 11 October 1986.

He set up the second try for Russ Walker as Hull F.C. won the 1991 Premiership final against Widnes at Old Trafford.

After 10 seasons with Hull, Eastwood finished his career with local rivals Hull Kingston Rovers and, as of 2007, worked as the manager of a plumbing and heating company BSS in Manchester.

By his own admission he was never the type of winger who would score length of the field tries, but his nuggety strength saw him cross for 117 tries in his English club career while his accurate goal kicking saw him as a valuable player at both club and test match level.

Eastwood's Testimonial match at Hull F.C. took place in 1994 at their home ground, The Boulevard.

International
Eastwood won the first of his 18 test and World Cup caps for Great Britain against Papua New Guinea in Goroka during the 1990 Great Britain Lions tour as the Lions suffered a shock 20–18 defeat by the Kumuls. He would score the first of his 7 test tries in the game at the Danny Leahy Oval.

Later that year played in all three Ashes series tests against the touring Australians, scoring 2 tries in the Lions 19–12 win in the opening test at Wembley Stadium. In the second test at Old Trafford he missed two pressure, but relatively simple goals that could have won Britain The Ashes for the first time since 1970, as Australia won a tense game 14–10. After hooking an earlier conversion attempt, when Paul Loughlin scored an intercept try Eastwood, a left foot kicker, asked the St. Helens goal kicking centre if he wanted to take the kick (which was in almost the same spot as his earlier attempt) which suited his right foot kicking. Loughlin however declined and Eastwood ultimately sliced his kick to the left of the posts. Had it gone over it would have given the Lions a 12–10 lead with just 10 minutes remaining. Australia would go on to win the third and deciding test 14–0 at the Elland Road stadium in Leeds.

Eastwood was selected to go on the 1992 Great Britain Lions tour of Australasia, playing in 5 of the 6 test matches on the tour (one against PNG and 2 each against Australia and New Zealand). With 58 points from 3 tries and 23 goals, Eastwood was the leading point scorer on tour. While in Australia, Eastwood came under fan and media criticism for the amount of time he took with his goal kicks. He kicked at around 80% accuracy during his 8 games on tour. He played the last of his 18 tests, kicking 3 goals in Great Britain's 19–16 win over New Zealand at Carlaw Park in Auckland on 19 July 1992.

References

External links
!Great Britain Statistics at englandrl.co.uk (statistics currently missing due to not having appeared for both Great Britain, and England)
(archived by web.archive.org) Meninga saves the day
(archived by web.archive.org) When Britain defeated the Aussies
(archived by web.archive.org) "Caught in time - Hull win 1991 RL Premiership"

1965 births
Living people
English rugby league players
Great Britain national rugby league team players
Hull F.C. players
Hull Kingston Rovers players
Rugby league wingers
Rugby league players from Kingston upon Hull